Subbotovo is a rural locality (a village) in Trubchevsky District, Bryansk Oblast, Russia. The population was 21 as of 2010. There is 1 street.

Geography 
Subbotovo is located 17 km northeast of Trubchevsk (the district's administrative centre) by road. Radutino is the nearest rural locality.

References 

Rural localities in Trubchevsky District